The Infatuations (Spanish: Los enamoramientos) is a National Novel Prize-winning novel by Javier Marías, published in 2011. The translation into English by Margaret Jull Costa was published by Hamish Hamilton in 2013.

It was shortlisted for the 2014 National Book Critics Circle Award (Fiction).

References

Novels by Javier Marías
2011 novels
21st-century Spanish novels
Alfaguara books